Jesús Ledesma Aguilar (November 28, 1963 – May 24, 2006) was a Mexican national who became the 365th person executed by the U.S. state of Texas. His execution sparked an international incident between the United States and Mexico, which led to a lawsuit filed by Mexico against the United States in the International Court of Justice, in which the court found that Texas prison officials had denied Aguilar his right to see a Mexican consular official as specified in the Vienna Convention on Consular Relations.

Crimes 

Aguilar was convicted by a Texas court of murdering two people, Leonardo Chavez and Annette Chavez, on June 10, 1995 with a handgun and sentenced to death on July 5, 1995. He did not know his victims. The couple's son said he witnessed the murders and testified against Aguilar at trial. Aguilar filed numerous appeals and requests for stays of execution, all of which were denied. He was executed on May 24, 2006 at 6:32 p.m. CST by lethal injection, despite his continued claims of innocence and protests by the government of Mexico that he was denied his right under the Geneva Conventions to a visit by a Mexican consular official.

The ICJ found that the United States "has breached its obligations to Mr. Avena and 50 other Mexican nationals and to Mexico under the Vienna Convention on Consular Relations." As a result of the court's ruling, Texas officials now provide official notification to the Mexican government if a Mexican national is arrested and incarcerated in a Texas jail, and allow consular officials to visit Mexican nationals in prison.

Incarceration and execution
Aguilar, Texas Department of Criminal Justice (TDCJ)# 999191, was received by the prison system on May 13, 1996. Ledesma was initially located in the Ellis Unit, but was transferred to the Allan B. Polunsky Unit (formerly the Terrell Unit) in 1999. Put to death at Huntsville Unit, he was executed on May 24, 2006.

See also
 Capital punishment in Texas
 Capital punishment in the United States
 List of people executed in Texas, 2000–2009
 List of people executed in the United States in 2006

References

External links
 Clark County Prosecutor's Office record of legal proceedings
 Decision of ICJ in Avena and Other Mexican Nationals (Mexico v. United States of America)

1963 births
2006 deaths
1995 murders in the United States
Executed Mexican people
Diplomatic incidents
Place of birth missing
21st-century executions by Texas
People executed by Texas by lethal injection
Mexican people executed abroad